Taylor Lauren Porter (born October 29, 1997) is an American professional soccer player who plays as a midfielder for National Women's Soccer League (NWSL) club Portland Thorns FC.

Club career 
Porter signed with the Portland Thorns FC in 2021 when players from the US Women's National team were at the Olympics.  She re-signed with the Thorns for the 2022 season.

Honors 
Portland Thorns FC

 NWSL Championship: 2022

References

External links 
 NC State profile
 

Living people
1997 births
American women's soccer players
ŽFK Spartak Subotica players
UD Granadilla Tenerife players
Orlando Pride players
Portland Thorns FC players
Women's association football midfielders
National Women's Soccer League players
21st-century American women
NC State Wolfpack women's soccer players
Expatriate women's footballers in Serbia
Expatriate women's footballers in Spain
American expatriate women's soccer players
American expatriate sportspeople in Serbia
American expatriate sportspeople in Spain
Soccer players from San Diego